Agyneta jacksoni is a species of sheet weavers found in Canada, Greenland and the United States. It was described by Braendegaard in 1937.

References

jacksoni
Spiders described in 1937
Spiders of Canada
Invertebrates of Greenland